The MSI Wind Netbook was a family of subnotebooks / netbooks designed by Micro-Star International (MSI). Wind stands for "Wi-Fi Network Device". The first model was announced at CeBIT  2008,  and first listed for pre-orders on May 9, 2008. While initially 8.9- and 10.1-inch screen versions existed, as of 2010 only the 10.1" remained, with a resolution of 1024 × 600. While most models had 1 GB of RAM, some had 2 GB, and hard disks ranged from 80 GB on the oldest to 250 GB on the newest models. Also featured were Bluetooth, WLAN and a 1.3 megapixel camera. The Wind PC was MSI's response to the successful Asus Eee PC. The keyboard was 92% of full-size.

Now available by MSI are 10-inch and 7-inch Wind Pad tablets using the Android operating system.

OEM versions 

When the original Wind U100 was released, many original equipment manufacturer versions of the Wind were also released, under different names.
 Advent 4211, 4222 as an in-store brand for PC City, PC World and other Dixons Stores Group retailers in Europe and the UK.
 Ahtec LUG N011 in the Netherlands, Spain and Belgium. Offered with SUSE Linux, Windows XP or no operating system. Has the same design as the original Wind (white). Comes without logo on the case. Can be upgraded at purchase.
 Averatec Buddy
 Axioo Pico in Indonesia with a 160 GB HDD, versions with and without Bluetooth
 Certified Data U100 in Canada, sold at London Drugs.
 LG X110, marketed in Argentina, Brazil (modelos x110-1010 and 1000) and Sweden
 Hannspree HANNSnote with a 6-cell battery and a 160 GB HDD
 Medion Akoya Mini in Germany, Switzerland, Austria, the Netherlands, Belgium, Denmark, Spain, France, the United Kingdom, Ireland, Poland and Australia (as of 23 October 2008) (the Medion Akoya Mini is a slightly different containing a different wireless card, no Bluetooth (Aust. model features mini Bluetooth dongle), and 0.3 Mpx camera).
 Mivvy M310 in the Czech Republic. but with 2 GB of RAM and a 120 GB HDD.
 Mouse Computer LuvBook U100 in Japan.
 Multirama HT Xpress Book in Greece with 160 GB HDD
 NTT Corrino 101I and Aristo Pico i300 in Poland
 Positivo Mobo White in Brazil, with 4 models: 1000, 1050, 1070 and 1090. All sport Intel Atom Processors and range from 512 MB RAM / 80 GB HDD (Mobo White 1000) to 1 GB RAM and 160 GB HDD (Mobo White 1090).
 Proline U100 in South Africa.
 ProLink Glee TA-009 in Singapore with touchpad buttons positioned by the side and optional 3G HSDPA connectivity.
 RoverBook Neo U100 in Russia with 120 GB or 160 GB HDD
 Terra 10G in Europe with various option
 Tsunami Moover T10 in Portugal (XP version only)

Some OEM versions are offered in different colors to the original MSI Wind, apart from the Tsunami Moover (white only), the Mobo White and the Ahtec LUG N011 (white only).

Specifications

Customization 
The MSI Wind netbooks (specifically the MSI Wind U100) have been subject to customization; especially as Hackintoshes. Though many other netbooks can also be installed with Mac OS X, the MSI Wind is one of the most popular mainly because of its ideally large keyboard, simple design, and wide availability of options. The MSI Wind (specifically the U100) can be installed with Mac OS X Snow Leopard 10.6.8 with a modified bootloader and kernel.
Installing ChromeOS and turning it into a Chromebook is also a common customization.

See also 
Comparison of netbooks

References

External links 

 current MSI Wind products (official site)

Subnotebooks
Linux-based devices
MSI netbooks
Consumer electronics brands